Macrocyttara is a genus of moths in the family Cossidae.

Species
 Macrocyttara expressa T.P. Lucas, 1902
 Macrocyttara pamphaea Turner, 1945

References

Natural History Museum Lepidoptera generic names catalog

Cossinae